The 2017–18 Biathlon World Cup – Stage 2 was the 2nd event of the season and was held in Hochfilzen, Austria, from 8 December until 10 December 2017.

Schedule of events

Medal winners

Men

Women

References 

Biathlon World Cup - Stage 2, 2017-18
2017–18 Biathlon World Cup
Biathlon World Cup - Stage 2
Sport in Tyrol (state)
Biathlon competitions in Austria